Biswanath Karak is an Indian politician from Bharatiya Janata Party. In May 2021, he was elected as a member of the West Bengal Legislative Assembly from Goghat (constituency). He defeated Manas Majumdar of All India Trinamool Congress by 4,147 votes in 2021 West Bengal Assembly election.

In 2011 West Bengal Assembly election, he was elected from same seat as a member of All India Forward Bloc.

References 

Living people
Year of birth missing (living people)
21st-century Indian politicians
People from Hooghly district
Bharatiya Janata Party politicians from West Bengal
All India Forward Bloc politicians
West Bengal MLAs 2021–2026
West Bengal MLAs 2011–2016